The Duke of Roxburghe is a title in the peerage of Scotland created in 1707 along with the titles Marquess of Bowmont and Cessford, Earl of Kelso and Viscount Broxmouth. John Ker, 5th Earl of Roxburghe became the first holder of these titles. The title is derived from the royal burgh of Roxburgh in the Scottish Borders that in 1460 the Scots captured and destroyed.

Originally created Earl of Roxburghe in 1616, before the elevation to duke, a number of other subsidiary titles are held: Marquess of Bowmont and Cessford (created 1707), Earl of Kelso (1707), Earl Innes (1837), Viscount Broxmouth (1707), Lord Roxburghe (1600), and Lord Ker of Cessford and Cavertoun (1616). All of the titles form part of the peerage of Scotland, with the exception the Earldom of Innes, which belongs to the peerage of the United Kingdom. The Duke's eldest son bears the courtesy title of Marquess of Bowmont and Cessford.

The dukedom and its associated titles descend to heirs who shall inherit the earldom which in turn had a very specific line of descent. On the death of the 4th duke the titles became dormant as no one could prove their claim. In 1812 the House of Lords ruled in favour of Sir James Innes-Ker, 6th Baronet, of Innes (see Innes baronets), rejecting claims by the heir female of the second earl and heir male whatsoever of the first earl.

The Duke of Roxburghe would be the Chief of Clan Innes, but cannot be so recognised as he retains the name Innes-Ker.

The family has its seat at Floors Castle near Kelso, Scotland. The grounds contain the ruins of Roxburgh Castle on a promontory between the rivers Tweed and Teviot. The traditional burial place of the Dukes of Roxburghe is the Roxburghe Memorial Cloister (also known as "Roxburghe Aisle"), a 20th-century addition to the ruins of Kelso Abbey.

Earls of Roxburghe (1616)
In 1600, Robert Ker was created Lord Roxburghe, in 1616 he was additionally created Earl of Roxburghe, and Lord Ker of Cessford and Cavertoun. The succession was originally to heirs male of the 1st Earl, but after his sons predeceased him, the title was recreated in 1646 with additional remainder in favour of "(i) his grandson by his eldest daughter, Sir William Drummond, and his issue in tail male, (ii) of his great-grandsons in like manner, i.e. the second and other younger sons of Jane Drummond, the sister of Sir William Drummond, by her husband John [Fleming], 3rd Earl of Wigtown [...] which failing (iii) of the eldest daughter of Hon Harry Ker, styled Lord Ker, without division and to her heirs male, which failing (iv) to his own heirs male whomsoever".

Robert Ker, 1st Earl of Roxburghe (1570–1650) had been Lord Roxburghe since 1600, died without male issue
William Ker, Lord Ker (died 1618), elder son of the 1st Earl, predeceased his father without issue
Henry Ker, Lord Ker (died 1643), younger son of the 1st Earl, predeceased his father without male issue
William Ker, 2nd Earl of Roxburghe (1622–1675), a female-line grandson of the 1st Earl, succeeded him by the above special arrangement
Robert Ker, 3rd Earl of Roxburghe (c. 1658–1682), eldest son of the 2nd Earl
Robert Ker, 4th Earl of Roxburghe (c. 1677–1696), eldest son of the 3rd Earl
John Ker, 5th Earl of Roxburghe (c. 1680–1741), second son of the 3rd Earl, became Duke of Roxburghe in 1707

Dukes of Roxburghe (1707)
John Ker, 1st Duke of Roxburghe (c. 1680–1741), second son of the 3rd Earl, he was additionally invested as Marquess of Bowmont and Cessford as well as Earl of Kelso and Viscount Broxmouth in 1707; the earlier titles held as Earl were also retained
Robert Ker, 2nd Duke of Roxburghe (c. 1709–1755), only son of the 1st Duke, in 1722 he was created both Earl Ker and Baron Ker of Wakefield in the County of York
John Ker, 3rd Duke of Roxburghe (1740–1804), elder son of the 2nd Duke inheriting the 1722 titles, died without issue
William Bellenden-Ker, 4th Duke of Roxburghe (1728–1805), grandson of Lord Bellenden of Broughton (created 1661) who was the fourth and youngest son of the 2nd Earl, died without issue and the Roxburghe titles went dormant until 1812
James Innes-Ker, 5th Duke of Roxburghe (1736–1823), great-grandson of Hon. Margaret Ker (died 1681), daughter of Hon. Henry Ker, Lord Ker (died 1642/3), the younger son of the 1st Earl
James Innes-Ker, 6th Duke of Roxburghe (1816–1879), only son of the 5th Duke, he was created Earl Innes in the peerage of the United Kingdom in 1837
James Henry Robert Innes-Ker, 7th Duke of Roxburghe (1839–1892), elder son of the 6th Duke
Henry John Innes-Ker, 8th Duke of Roxburghe (1876–1932), eldest son of the 7th Duke
George Victor Robert John Innes-Ker, 9th Duke of Roxburghe (1913–1974), only son of the 8th Duke
Guy David Innes-Ker, 10th Duke of Roxburghe (1954–2019), elder son of the 9th Duke
Charles Robert George Innes-Ker, 11th Duke of Roxburghe (born 1981), eldest son of the 10th Duke

The heir presumptive is the current holder's younger brother, Lord Edward Arthur Gerald "Ted" Innes-Ker (born 1984)

Line of succession

 George Innes-Ker, 9th Duke of Roxburghe (1913-1974)
  Guy Innes-Ker, 10th Duke of Roxburghe (1954-2019)
  Charles Innes-Ker, 11th Duke of Roxburghe (born 1981)
 (1) Lord Edward Innes-Ker (born 1984)
 (2) Lord George Innes-Ker (born 1996)
 (3) Lord Robin Innes-Ker (born 1959)
 (4) James Innes-Ker (born 1999)

Family tree

See also
Clan Innes
Roxburgh Castle
Castle Holydean
Earl of Perth
Earl of Melfort
 An 1810 auction of the Duke's library is featured in Susanna Clarke's novel Jonathan Strange & Mr. Norrell

References

External links 
 
http://www.stirnet.com/ (subscription only)

Dukedoms in the Peerage of Scotland
Scottish Borders
Lists of Scottish people
Noble titles created in 1707

Kelso, Scottish Borders
Peerages created with special remainders